Haplochromis rubripinnis is a species of cichlid endemic to Lake Victoria.  This species can reach a length of  SL.  This species may be placed back in the genus Lithochromis when a comprehensive review of Haplochromis is carried out.

References

rubripinnis
Fish of Lake Victoria
Fish of Tanzania
Endemic fauna of Tanzania
Fish described in 1998
Taxonomy articles created by Polbot